If You And Me (쥬리스) is the first EP album by Filipino singer Juris, released on November 12, 2010, in South Korea in CD format and digital download. It is also released in the Philippines in digital download by Star Records.

Background
The mini-album If You And Me consists only of 6 tracks including 2 English cover of Korean songs: "If" by Taeyeon of Girls' Generation and "Don't Forget" by Baek Ji-young. Also includes her cover of Tamia's "Officially Missing You" and "Opposites Attracts" composed by Junjee Marcelo which is also included in her first studio album Now Playing. The songs in the album were all recorded in the Philippines. Meanwhile, Juris is the first Filipino mainstream artist to release an album in South Korea. But before the release of her mini-album in Korea, it would be recalled that her song "Say You Love Me" taken from her former MYMP's album "Versions" that topped the Korean charts, Cyworld and BGM Charts for three months. In promotion of the album she appeared at the "Green Plugged Seoul 2011 Music Festival" on May 14, 2011 at the Nanji Hangang Park. Green Plugged Seoul 2011 is a two-day, multi-stage international festival that offers a variety of art performances including concerts, exhibits, plays, dance and other multi-media event with 117 participating artists from all over the world, including Korea, Finland, the United States, the United Kingdom, Japan, Sweden and the Philippines.

Track listing

 Track 1 "If You And Me" is the English cover of the Korean song "If" by Taeyeon of Girls' Generation.
 Track 2 "Don't Forget" is the English cover of the Korean song by Baek Ji-young.

Release history

References

See also
 Juris Official Site
 Twitter of Juris
 Facebook of Juris
 If You and Me on MelOn

Star Music EPs
2010 debut EPs
Juris Fernandez albums